Trichilemmoma (also known as "tricholemmoma") is a benign cutaneous neoplasm that shows differentiation toward cells of the outer root sheath. The lesion is often seen in the face and neck region.  Multifocal occurrence is associated with Cowden syndrome, in which hamartomatous intestinal polyposis is seen in conjunction with multiple tricholemmoma lesions.

Additional images

See also 
 Cowden syndrome
 Trichilemmal carcinoma
 List of cutaneous conditions
 List of cutaneous neoplasms associated with systemic syndromes

References

External links 

Epidermal nevi, neoplasms, and cysts